Jesse Roast (born 16 March 1964) is a former professional footballer who played in The Football League for Maidstone United.

References

English footballers
Barking F.C. players
Maidstone United F.C. (1897) players
English Football League players
1964 births
Living people
Association football fullbacks